Norrbotten County held a county council election on 19 September 2010, on the same day as the general and municipal elections.

Results
The number of seats remained at 71 with the Social Democrats winning the most at 33, a gain of two seats from 2006. The party received around 43.1% out of 160,783 valid votes.

Municipalities

Images

References

Elections in Norrbotten County
Norrbotten